Carolina Acevedo Rojas, born October 7, 1982 in Ibagué, is a Colombian actress. She played the lead character in the TV Series Mariana & Scarlett.

Life and career 
She is the eldest daughter of Ricardo Acevedo and Silvia Rojas. Acevedo also has a sister named Marcela that was born in 1982. She acted in a Colombian television tv series called Clase Aparte and Conjunto Cerrado. Acevedo started with her career in 1993 acting in the TV series "De Pies a Cabeza" directed by Andres Marroquin. In 2000 she was the protagonist in "Pobre Pablo" a novel of the RCN channel. She played María Alcalá, the daughter of a rich flower distributor in the USA. She also portrayed Gabriela in Season 2 of Narcos.

Filmography 
 De Pies a Cabeza as Violeta
 O Todos en la Cama as Silvia
 La Madre as Catalina Bernal
 Pobre Pablo as María Alcalá

External links
 
 All About Pobre Pablo in Spanish 

21st-century Colombian actresses
Living people
1982 births
Actresses from Bogotá
Colombian television actresses